Peroj is a village in the Town of Vodnjan on the south-western coast of Istria, Croatia. Peroj originally dates back to the Copper Age of prehistory, as testified by a necropolis within the old walls of the town. The town has been settled with families from a variety of origins throughout its history. During the occupation of the Romans, the town was named Pedrolo, and was a popular holiday destination.

Etymology 
The term "Peroj" is of debatable origin. One theory suggested by Bernardo Schiavuzzi claims that near modern-day Peroj existed a settlement known as Petroriolum (Petroro) ca. 1197. Camillo de Franceschi, however, suggested that Peroj derives from the archaic name "Pedroli".  An alternate theory suggests that the Montenegrin settlers derived the term Peroj from the Albanian word for stream - përrua (definite "përroi").

History 
In 1562 the town had been emptied due to malaria and plague, and Leonardo Fioravanti from Bologna brought to the area 124 families of farmers from the Romagna region of present day Italy, some of which settled in Peroj. However people from Pula felt their territories had been violated and began a series of persecutions which lead the families to leave the area.

In 1578 some Greek families were brought to the area, and between 1580 and 1583, 25 more Greek families from Nauplia were settled in Peroj, and 25 families from Cyprus were also settled. In 1585 the families from Nauplia renounced the lands given to them and left the area. The Cypriots remained, but gradually some left and some died due to the plagues affecting the region, and in 1644 the population of Peroj was reduced to three people only.

In 1657, the Doge of Venice, Bertuccio Valiero, decided to repopulate the town by bringing 15 families. Five of these families were of Orthodox religion, originally from the Cernizza region in Montenegro that had escaped from the Turkish occupation. Based on evidence, it is generally assumed that these Montenegrin settlers carried the surnames Brcela, Draković, Brajić, Vučeta, and Ljubotina. The remaining ten were of Roman Catholic religion but of unknown origin and are thought to be either of Croatian origin from Albania Veneta or of Albanian origin. However, these Catholic families soon emigrated from Peroj. Following the Cretan War of 1645–1669, twenty other families originally from Montenegro migrated to Peroj, amounting to 25 in total by 1677. These families remained in Peroj and until recently Serbo-Croatian was taught in the local schools due to their presence.

Demographics

Religion 

The majority of the population is of Serbian Orthodox faith with a Roman Catholic minority.

Three Christian churches exist in Peroj:
 Church of St. Stephen - Catholic church
 Church of St. Fusca - Catholic church
 Church of St. Spyridon - Serbian Orthodox church

Due to the overwhelming presence of Eastern Orthodox followers, the Orthodox church of Saint Spyridon (San Spiridione) was built in the 19th century following the conversion of the former Catholic church of Saint Jerome.

Photo gallery

See also
 Barbariga, Croatia
 St. Spyridon Church, Peroj

References

Sources

External links

 Peroj - Serbian Village in Istria by Fran Barbalić 
 Društvo Perojskih Crnogoraca 'PEROJ 1657' 

Populated places in Istria County